The Personal Filing Cabinet, also known as .pfc, is a proprietary filing system of AOL Desktop software that is designed to store and maintain emails of AOL on a computer hard drive for offline usage. AOL Desktop Software is the application version of the webmail service, America Online, better known as AOL.

A PFC file is generated for each user account configured on the desktop application for AOL. The file, as a proprietary, can only be opened using AOL Desktop Software. Moreover, a PFC file can strictly be read/accessed using its origin desktop application only.
The Personal Filing Cabinet is a binary file type that consists of different objects from AOL like Away Messages, Favorite Places, Newsgroup Postings, Stored Email Messages, and information related to Download Manager. However, PFC files are meant to store email messages but not the corresponding attachments. The inline attachments of AOL emails are stored in a 64 bit encoded structure.
The latest version of AOL Desktop Software client is version 9.8. In AOL version 7.00 and later, bodies of the emails stored in PFC files are compressed with the help of Zlib.

AOL Desktop Software client facilitates backup of PFC files as part of Business Continuity Planning procedure. The backup procedure takes place when the application is in offline state. The PFC backup is stored at a user-defined location on the machine for restoration in case of loss of original PFC.

See also 
List of filename extensions (M–R)

References

External links 
 Whatisfileextension web-site. Provides the information of PFC file.
 About AOL PFC (Personal Filing Cabinet) at archiveteam.org

Email storage formats
Computer file formats